Archeological Site No. 121-71 is a historic site in the Amgajejus Camps in Maine contained some of the Penobscot Headwater Lakes Prehistoric Sites which contain prehistoric Native American artifacts. The site was added to the National Register of Historic Places on October 31, 1999.

References

		
National Register of Historic Places in Piscataquis County, Maine